Tognon is an Italian surname. Notable people with the surname include:

Danilo Tognon (born 1937), Italian sprint canoer
Gianluca Tognon Italian food scientist, researcher, public health expert, author, and speaker
Omero Tognon (1924–1990), Italian footballer and manager

Italian-language surnames